Alifu Albert Massaquoi (born 6 April 1937) is a Liberian and Sierra Leonean former long-distance runner. Representing Liberia, he competed in the marathon at the 1960 Summer Olympics, finishing in last place of all runners who completed the race. At the 1968 Summer Olympics, he again competed in the marathon as well as the 10,000 metres, but represented Sierra Leone. Massaquoi stills hold the Sierra Leonean 10,000 metres record with a time of 31:06.29, set during the 1970 British Commonwealth Games.

References

External links
 

1937 births
Living people
Athletes (track and field) at the 1960 Summer Olympics
Athletes (track and field) at the 1968 Summer Olympics
Liberian male long-distance runners
Liberian male marathon runners
Sierra Leonean male long-distance runners
Sierra Leonean male marathon runners
Olympic athletes of Liberia
Olympic athletes of Sierra Leone
Athletes (track and field) at the 1966 British Empire and Commonwealth Games
Athletes (track and field) at the 1970 British Commonwealth Games
Commonwealth Games competitors for Sierra Leone
Massaquoi family